Sturegatan is a street in the borough of Östermalm in Stockholm.

References 
Streets in Stockholm